Larry Ndianefo, professionally known as Larry Gaaga, is a Nigerian songwriter, recording artist, music producer, and record label executive. He gained fame with the success of ‘Gaaga Shuffle’, a song he performed alongside Innocent ‘2Baba’ Idibia.

Early career
Larry Gaaga began his career in the entertainment industry in 2012 as the General Manager of YSG Entertainment, managing the career of rapper Vector. He went on to feature on one of Vector’s tracks, “Get Down” alongside 2Baba. That same year, he was nominated for “Entertainment Man of the Year” at the Nigerian Entertainment Awards.

Gaga Shuffle
In 2017, 2Baba released a collaborative track featuring Larry Gaaga, titled “Gaga Shuffle”,  the song was named after one of Larry Gaaga's signature dance moves. According to the song’s producer, Dapiano, the track was completely unplanned - it came about when both artists heard the track at the studio and was recorded within 30 minutes. It was the success of this song that encouraged Gaaga to pursue his passion for music and performing.

2018-present
In 2018, Larry Gaaga released five hit singles, including ‘Wonderful’ featuring Wande Coal and Sarkodie, and ‘Doe’ featuring Davido. He also collaborated with artists like Burna Boy, D’banj, Base One, DJ Neptune and Charass. That same year, Gaaga secured a record deal with Universal Music Group Nigeria. 

In 2019, Gaaga teamed up with 2Baba again to release the love song ‘Iworiwo’.  Soon after he released ‘Low’, a collaboration with Wizkid, that has already amassed over 11 million views on YouTube. While Gaaga is signed to Universal Music Group Nigeria, he remains the CEO of Gaaga Muzik.

In October 2019, it was revealed that Larry Gaaga had worked extensively on the soundtrack album for the sequel of one of Nigeria's premiere film productions, Living in Bondage. The album also featured Davido, Flavour, Peruzzi, Patoranking and 2Baba. In May 2020, he signed a record deal with Def Jam Africa, a flagship of Def Jam Recordings.

On 13 June 2022, Gaaga was announced as the vice president of Def Jam Africa, and the head of the A&R division across the English-speaking markets in Africa.

In November 2022, Gaaga and 2Baba formed a musical duo with the moniker The Kabal. They released their debut single as a duo tagged Mad Over Hills in the same month.

Awards and nominations

Other ventures
In addition to music, Gaaga is an oil and gas executive, and sits on the board of KL Oil and Gas. Larry Gaaga is also a brand ambassador for both D’usse and Afa Sports. On 5th November 2022, he was unveiled alongside Pere Egbi and Cubana Chief Priest, as ambassadors for Gulder lager beer as part of the "Ultimate Squad" for the "Senior Man" campaign.

Discography
 Egedege Ft. Phyno, Flavour and Theresa Onuorah
Iworiwo Ft. 2baba Shawa Shawa Ft Dj Neptune, Slimcase, Olamide, CDQ
 Doe Ft Davido
 Baba Nla Ft 2baba, Burna Boy & D’Banj
 Azaman ft. Slimcase, 2baba & Peruzzi
 Wonderful Ft. Sarkodie, Wande Coal
 Sho Ja Ft. Base One
 Kiri Koko Ft Shina Peller, Broda Shaggi
 Low Ft Wizkid
 In My Head ft Patoranking
Doubting Thomas ft Davido
Man No Be God Ft. Charass
Abeg Ft, Magnito, Uzikwendu, Slow Dogg and Zoro

References 

Year of birth missing (living people)
Living people
Nigerian songwriters